Edmond Van Herck (10 July 1913 – 3 July 2007) was a Belgian rower. He competed in the men's coxless pair event at the 1936 Summer Olympics.

References

1913 births
2007 deaths
Belgian male rowers
Olympic rowers of Belgium
Rowers at the 1936 Summer Olympics
Sportspeople from Antwerp